Katharina Krüger (born 3 January 1990) is a German wheelchair tennis player who competes in international level events. She is a three-time quarterfinalist in the Australian Open and French Open and has participated at three Summer Paralympic Games and reached the second round in the singles' events. She was a runner-up in the 2009 Australian Open where she partnered with Agnieszka Wysocka and lost to Korie Homan and Esther Vergeer in the final. Krüger has used a wheelchair from an early age as she was born with spina bifida.

References

External links
 
 
 

1990 births
Living people
German female tennis players
Wheelchair tennis players
Paralympic wheelchair tennis players of Germany
Wheelchair tennis players at the 2008 Summer Paralympics
Wheelchair tennis players at the 2012 Summer Paralympics
Wheelchair tennis players at the 2016 Summer Paralympics
People with spina bifida
Wheelchair users
Tennis players from Berlin
21st-century German women